Hezekiah, or Ezekias (born , sole ruler ), was the son of Ahaz and the 13th king of Judah according to the Hebrew Bible.

Hezekiah enacted sweeping religious reforms, including a strict mandate for the sole worship of Yahweh and a prohibition on venerating other deities within the Temple of Jerusalem. He is considered a very righteous king in both the Second Book of Kings and the Second Book of Chronicles. He is also one of the more prominent kings of Judah mentioned in the Bible and is one of the kings mentioned in the genealogy of Jesus in the Gospel of Matthew. "No king of Judah, among either his predecessors or his successors, could [...] be compared to him", according to 2 Kings 18:5. Isaiah and Micah prophesied during his reign.

Etymology
The name Hezekiah means "Yahweh strengthens" in Hebrew. Alternately it may be translated as "Yahweh is my strength".

Biblical sources
The main biblical accounts of Hezekiah's reign are found in 2 Kings, Isaiah, and 2 Chronicles. Proverbs 25:1 commences a collection of King Solomon's proverbs which were "copied by the officials of King Hezekiah of Judah". His reign is also referred to in the books of the prophets Jeremiah, Hosea, Micah, and Isaiah. The books of Hosea and Micah record that their prophecies were made during Hezekiah's reign. The book of Isaiah records when Hezekiah sought Isaiah's help when Judah was under siege by King Sennacherib of Assyria.

Dates
Based on Edwin Thiele's dating, Hezekiah was born in c. 741 BCE and died in c. 687 BCE at age 54. Thiele and William F. Albright calculated his regnal years arriving at figures very close to each other, c. 715/16 and 686/87 BCE. However, Gershon Galil dates his reign to 697–642 BCE.

Family and life
Hezekiah was the son of king Ahaz and Abijah. His mother, Abijah (also called Abi), was a daughter of the high priest Zechariah. He was married to Hephzibah. He died from natural causes at the age of 54 in c. 687 BCE, and was succeeded by his son Manasseh.

Reign over Judah

According to the biblical narrative, Hezekiah assumed the throne of Judah at the age of 25 and reigned for 29 years. Some writers  have proposed that Hezekiah served as coregent with his father Ahaz for about 14 years. His sole reign is dated by Albright as 715–687 BCE, and by Thiele as 716–687 BCE (the last ten years being a co-regency with his son Manasseh).

Restoration of the Temple
According to the Bible, Hezekiah purified and repaired the Temple, purged its idols, and reformed the priesthood. In an effort to abolish idolatry from his kingdom, he destroyed the high places (or bamot) and the "bronze serpent" (or Nehushtan), recorded as being made by Moses, which had become objects of idolatrous worship. In place of this, he centralized the worship of God at the Temple in Jerusalem. Hezekiah also defeated the Philistines, "as far as Gaza and its territory", and resumed the Passover pilgrimage and the tradition of inviting the scattered tribes of Israel to take part in a Passover festival.

2 Chronicles 30 (but not the parallel account in 2 Kings) records that Hezekiah sent messengers to Ephraim and Manasseh inviting them to Jerusalem for the celebration of the Passover. The messengers, however, were not only not listened to, but were even laughed at, although a few men of the tribes of Asher, Manasseh and Zebulun "were humble enough to come" to the city. According to the biblical account, the Passover was celebrated with great solemnity and such rejoicing as had not been seen in Jerusalem since the days of Solomon. The celebration took place during the second month, Iyar, because not enough priests had consecrated themselves in the first month.

Biblical writer H. P. Mathys suggests that Hezekiah, being unable to restore the union of Judah and Israel by political means, used the invitation to the northern tribes as a final religious "attempt to restore the unity of the cult". He also notes that this account "is often considered to contain historically reliable elements, especially since negative aspects are also reported on", although he questions the full extent to which it may be considered historically reliable.

Political moves and Assyrian invasion

After the death of Assyrian king Sargon II in 705 BCE, Sargon's son Sennacherib became king of Assyria. In 703 BCE, Sennacherib began a series of major campaigns to quash opposition to Assyrian rule, starting with cities in the eastern part of the realm. In 701 BCE, Sennacherib turned toward cities in the west. Hezekiah then had to face the invasion of Judah. According to the Bible, Hezekiah did not rely on Egypt for support, but relied on God and prayed to Him for deliverance of his capital city Jerusalem.

The Assyrians recorded that Sennacherib lifted his siege of Jerusalem after Hezekiah paid Sennacherib tribute. The Bible records that Hezekiah paid him three hundred talents of silver and thirty of gold as tribute, even sending the doors of the Temple to produce the promised amount, but, even after the payment was made, Sennacherib renewed his assault on Jerusalem. Sennacherib surrounded the city and sent his Rabshakeh to the walls as a messenger. The Rabshakeh addressed the soldiers manning the city wall in Hebrew (Yehudith), asking them to distrust Yahweh and Hezekiah, claiming that Hezekiah's righteous reforms (destroying the idols and High Places) were a sign that the people should not trust their god to be favorably disposed. 2 Kings records that Hezekiah went to the Temple and there he prayed to God.

Hezekiah's construction

Knowing that Jerusalem would eventually be subject to siege, Hezekiah had been preparing for some time by fortifying the walls of the capital, building towers, and constructing a tunnel to bring fresh water to the city from a spring outside its walls. He made at least two major preparations that would help Jerusalem to resist conquest: the construction of the Siloam Tunnel, and construction of the Broad Wall.

Sennacherib was intent on making war against Jerusalem. Therefore Hezekiah consulted with his officers about stopping the flow of the springs outside the city. Otherwise, they thought, the King of Assyria would come and find water in abundance.

The narratives of the Bible state that Sennacherib's army besieged Jerusalem.

Battle with Sennacherib's army

According to the biblical record, Sennacherib sent threatening letters warning Hezekiah that he had not desisted from his determination to take the Judean capital. Although they besieged Jerusalem, the biblical accounts state that the Assyrians did not so much as "shoot an arrow there, ... nor cast up a siege rampart against it", and that God sent out an angel who, in one night, struck down "a hundred and eighty-five thousand in the camp of the Assyrians," sending Sennacherib back "with shame of face to his own land".

Sennacherib's inscriptions make no mention of the disaster suffered by his forces. But, as Professor Jack Finegan comments: "In view of the general note of boasting which pervades the inscriptions of the Assyrian kings, ... it is hardly to be expected that Sennacherib would record such a defeat." The Cambridge Bible for Schools and Colleges refers to an "Egyptian tradition, according to which Sennacherib had already reached Pelusium in Egypt, when in a single night his army was rendered helpless by a plague of field-mice which gnawed the bows of the soldiers and the thongs of their shields". The version of the matter that Sennacherib presents, as found inscribed on what is known as the Sennacherib Prism preserved in the University of Chicago Oriental Institute, in part says: "As to Hezekiah, the Jew, he did not submit to my yoke ... Hezekiah himself ... did send me, later, to Nineveh, my lordly city, together with 30 talents of gold, 800 talents of silver, ..." This version inflates the number of silver talents sent from 300 to 800; but in other regards it confirms the biblical record and shows that Sennacherib made no claim that he captured Jerusalem. However, Sennacherib presents the matter of Hezekiah's paying tribute as having come after the Assyrian threat of a siege against Jerusalem, whereas the Bible states it was paid before.

Death of Sennacherib

Of Sennacherib's death, 2 Kings records:

"It came about as he was worshiping in the house of Nisroch his god, that Adrammelech and Sharezer killed him [Sennacherib] with the sword; and they escaped into the land of Ararat. And Esarhaddon his son became king in his place."

According to Assyrian records, Sennacherib was assassinated in 681 BCE, twenty years after the 701 BCE invasion of Judah. A Neo-Babylonian letter corroborates with the biblical account a sentiment from Sennacherib's sons to assassinate him, an event Assyriologists have reconstructed as historical. The son Arda-Mulissu, who is mentioned in the letter as killing anyone who would reveal his conspiracy, successfully murders his father in c. 681 BCE, and was most likely the Adrammelech in 2 Kings, though Sharezer is not known elsewhere. Assyriologists posit the murder was motivated because Esarhaddon was chosen as heir to the throne instead of Arda-Mulissu, the next eldest son. Assyrian and Hebrew biblical history corroborate that Esarhaddon ultimately did succeed the throne. Other Assyriologists assert that Sennacherib was murdered in revenge for his destruction of Babylon, a city sacred to all Mesopotamians, including the Assyrians.

Hezekiah's illness and recovery

Later in his life, Hezekiah was ill with a boil or an inflammation. Isaiah told him that the Lord said he should put his house in order because he would die. But Hezekiah prayed, and Isaiah returned saying that the Lord had heard his prayer and he would recover. Hezekiah asked for a sign, and Isaiah asked him whether the shadow should go forward ten degrees or go back ten degrees. Hezekiah said it should go back, and the account states, "Isaiah the prophet cried unto the LORD: and he brought the shadow ten degrees backward, by which it had gone down in the dial of Ahaz." The narrative of his sickness and miraculous recovery is found in 2 Kings, 2 Chronicles and Isaiah.

Various ambassadors came to congratulate him on his recovery, among them from Merodach-baladan, son of the king of Babylon, "for he had heard that Hezekiah had been sick". Hezekiah, his vanity flattered by the visit, showed the Babylonian embassy all the wealth, arms and stores of Jerusalem, revealing too much information to Baladan, king of Babylon (or perhaps boasting about his wealth). He was then confronted by Isaiah, who foretold that a future generation of the people of Judah would be taken as captives to Babylon. Hezekiah was reassured that his own lifetime would see peace and security.

According to Isaiah, Hezekiah lived another 15 years after praying to God. His son and successor, Manasseh, was born during this time: he was 12 years of age when he succeeded Hezekiah.

According to the Talmud, the disease came about because of a dispute between him and Isaiah over who should pay whom a visit and over Hezekiah's refusal to marry and have children, although in the end he married Isaiah's daughter. Some Talmudists also considered that it might have come about as a way for Hezekiah to purge his sins or due to his arrogance in assuming his righteousness.

Extra-biblical records

Extra-biblical sources specify Hezekiah by name, along with his reign and influence. "Historiographically, his reign is noteworthy for the convergence of a variety of biblical sources and diverse extrabiblical evidence often bearing on the same events. Significant data concerning Hezekiah appear in the Deuteronomistic History, the Chronicler, Isaiah, Assyrian annals and reliefs, Israelite epigraphy, and, increasingly, stratigraphy". Archaeologist Amihai Mazar calls the tensions between Assyria and Judah "one of the best-documented events of the Iron Age" (172). Hezekiah's story is one of the best to cross-reference with the rest of the Mid Eastern world's historical documents.

Archaeological record

A seal impression dating back to 727–698 BCE, reading "לחזקיהו [בן] אחז מלך יהדה" "Belonging to Hezekiah [son of] Ahaz king of Judah" was uncovered in a dig at the Ophel in Jerusalem. The impression on this inscription was set in ancient Hebrew script.

A lintel inscription, found over the doorway of a tomb, has been ascribed to his secretary, Shebnah.

LMLK stored jars along the border with Assyria "demonstrate careful preparations to counter Sennacherib's likely route of invasion" and show "a notable degree of royal control of towns and cities which would facilitate Hezekiah's destruction of rural sacrificial sites and his centralization of worship in Jerusalem". Evidence suggests they were used throughout his 29-year reign. There are some bullae from sealed documents that may have belonged to Hezekiah himself.

In 2015, Eilat Mazar discovered a bulla that bears an inscription in ancient Hebrew script that translates as: "Belonging to Hezekiah [son of] Ahaz king of Judah." This is the first seal impression of an Israelite or Judean king to come to light in a scientific archaeological excavation. While another, unprovenanced bulla of King Hezekiah was known, this was the first time a seal impression of Hezekiah had been discovered in situ in the course of actual excavations. Archaeological findings like the Hezekiah seal led scholars to surmise that the ancient Judahite kingdom had a highly developed administrative system. In 2018 Mazar published a report discussing the discovery of a bulla which she says may have to have belonged to Isaiah. She believes the fragment to have been part of a seal whose complete text might have read "Belonging to Isaiah the prophet." Several other biblical archaeologists, including George Washington University's Christopher Rollston have pointed to the bulla being incomplete, and the present inscription not enough to necessarily refer to the biblical figure.

Two fragmented inscriptions mentioning Hezekiah have been discovered during excavations in Jerusalem. The fragments have been identified as monumental or dedicatory inscriptions, which, if accurate, would represent the only known example(s) of such an artifact made by an Israelite king.

Increase in the power of Judah
According to the work of archaeologists and philologists, the reign of Hezekiah saw a notable increase in the power of the Judean state. At this time Judah was the strongest nation on the Assyrian–Egyptian frontier. There were increases in literacy and in the production of literary works. The massive construction of the Broad Wall was made during his reign, the city was enlarged to accommodate a large influx, and population increased in Jerusalem up to 25,000, "five times the population under Solomon." Archaeologist Amihai Mazar explains, "Jerusalem was a virtual city-state where the majority of the state's population was concentrated," in comparison to the rest of Judah's cities (167). Archaeologist Israel Finkelstein says, "The key phenomenon—which cannot be explained solely against the background of economic prosperity—was the sudden growth of the population of Jerusalem in particular, and of Judah in general" (153). He says the cause of this growth must be a large influx of Israelites fleeing from the Assyrian destruction of the northern state. It is "[t]he only reasonable way to explain this unprecedented demographic development" (154). This, according to Finkelstein, set the stage for motivations to compile and reconcile Hebrew history into a text at that time (157). Mazar questions this explanation, since, he argues, it is "no more than an educated guess" (167).

Siloam inscription

The Siloam Tunnel was chiseled through 533 meters (1,750 feet) of solid rock in order to provide Jerusalem underground access to the waters of the Gihon Spring or Siloam Pool, which lay outside the city.

The Siloam Inscription from the Siloam Tunnel is now in the Istanbul Archaeology Museum. It "commemorates the dramatic moment when the two original teams of tunnelers, digging with picks from opposite ends of the tunnel, met each other" (564). It is "[o]ne of the most important ancient Hebrew inscriptions ever discovered." Finkelstein and Mazar cite this tunnel as an example of Jerusalem's impressive state-level power at the time.

Archaeologists like William G. Dever have pointed at archaeological evidence for the iconoclasm during the period of Hezekiah's reign. The central cult room of the temple at Arad (a royal Judean fortress) was deliberately and carefully dismantled, "with the altars and massebot" concealed "beneath a Str. 8 plaster floor". This stratum correlates with the late 8th century; Dever concludes that "the deliberate dismantling of the temple and its replacement by another structure in the days of Hezekiah is an archeological fact. I see no reason for skepticism here."

Lachish relief

Under Rehoboam, Lachish became the second-most important city of the kingdom of Judah. During the revolt of king Hezekiah against Assyria, it was captured by Sennacherib despite determined resistance (see Siege of Lachish).

As the Lachish relief attests, Sennacherib began his siege of the city of Lachish in 701 BCE. The Lachish Relief graphically depicts the battle, and the defeat of the city, including Assyrian archers marching up a ramp and Judahites pierced through on mounted stakes. "The reliefs on these slabs" discovered in the Assyrian palace at Nineveh "originally formed a single, continuous work, measuring 8 feet ... tall by 80 feet ... long, which wrapped around the room" (559). Visitors "would have been impressed not only by the magnitude of the artwork itself but also by the magnificent strength of the Assyrian war machine."

Sennacherib's Prism of Nineveh

Sennacherib's Prism was found buried in the foundations of the Nineveh palace. It was written in cuneiform, the Mesopotamian form of writing of the day. The prism records the conquest of 46 strong towns and "uncountable smaller places," along with the siege of Jerusalem where Sennacherib says he just "shut him up ... like a bird in a cage," subsequently enforcing a larger tribute upon him.

The Hebrew Bible states that during the night, the angel of YHWH (Hebrew: יהוה‎) brought death to 185,000 Assyrians troops, forcing the army to abandon the siege, yet it also records a tribute paid to Sennacherib of 300 silver talents following the siege. There is no account of the supernatural event in the prism. Sennacherib's account records his levying of a tribute from Hezekiah, a payment of 800 silver talents, which suggests a capitulation to end the siege. However, inscriptions have been discovered describing Sennacherib's defeat of the Ethiopian forces. These say: "As to Hezekiah, the Jew, he did not submit to my yoke, I laid siege to 46 of his strong cities ... and conquered (them). ... Himself I made a prisoner in Jerusalem, his royal residence, like a bird in a cage." He does not claim to have captured the city. This is consistent with the Bible account of Hezekiah's revolt against Assyria in the sense that neither account seems to indicate that Sennacherib ever entered or formally captured the city. Sennacherib in this inscription claims that Hezekiah paid for tribute 800 talents of silver, in contrast with the Bible's 300, however this could be due to boastful exaggeration which was not uncommon amongst kings of the period. Furthermore, the annals record a list of booty sent from Jerusalem to Nineveh. In the inscription, Sennacherib claims that Hezekiah accepted servitude, and some theorize that Hezekiah remained on his throne as a vassal ruler. The campaign is recorded with differences in the Assyrian records and in the biblical Books of Kings; there is agreement that the Assyrian have a propensity for exaggeration.

One theory that takes the biblical view posits that a defeat was caused by "possibly an outbreak of the bubonic plague". Another that this is a composite text which makes use of a 'legendary motif' analogous to that of the Exodus story.

 Where the 2 Kings account explains giving 300 talents of silver, Sennacherib's prism records 800 talents. "This discrepancy may be the result of differences in the weight of Assyrian and Israelite silver talents, or it may simply be due to the Assyrian propensity for exaggeration" (558).

Other records
The Greek historian Herodotus (c. 484 BCE – c. 425 BCE) wrote of the invasion and acknowledges many Assyrian deaths, which he claims were the result of a plague of mice. The Jewish historian Josephus followed the writings of Herodotus. These historians record Sennacherib's failure to take Jerusalem is "uncontested".

The Talmud (Bava Batra 15a) credits Hezekiah with overseeing the compilation of the biblical books of Isaiah, Proverbs, Song of Songs and Ecclesiastes.

According to Jewish tradition, the victory over the Assyrians and Hezekiah's return to health happened at the same time, the first night of Passover.

Rabbinic literature

Abi saved the life of her son Hezekiah, whom her godless husband, Ahaz, had designed as an offering to Moloch. By anointing him with the blood of the salamander, she enabled him to pass through the fire of Moloch unscathed (Sanh. 63b).

Hezekiah is considered as the model of those who put their trust in the Lord. Only during his sickness did he waver in his hitherto unshaken trust and require a sign, for which he was blamed by Isaiah (Lam. R. i.). The Hebrew name "Ḥizḳiyyah" is considered by the Talmudists to be a surname, meaning either "strengthened by Yhwh" or "he who made a firm alliance between the Israelites and Yhwh"; his eight other names are enumerated in Isa. ix. 5 (Sanh. 94a). He is called the restorer of the study of the Law in the schools, and is said to have planted a sword at the door of the bet ha-midrash, declaring that he who would not study the Law should be struck with the weapon (ib. 94b).

Hezekiah's piety, which, according to the Talmudists, alone occasioned the destruction of the Assyrian army and the signal deliverance of the Israelites when Jerusalem was attacked by Sennacherib, caused him to be considered by some as the Messiah (ib. 99a). According to Bar Kappara, Hezekiah was destined to be the Messiah, but the attribute of justice ("middat ha-din") protested against this, saying that as David, who sang so much the glory of God, had not been made the Messiah, still less should Hezekiah, for whom so many miracles had been performed, yet who did not sing the praise of God (ib. 94a).

Menachot 109b tells of Hezekiah encouraging others to keep their faith:

Hezekiah and Isaiah

Hezekiah's dangerous illness was caused by the discord between him and Isaiah, each of whom desired that the other should pay him the first visit. In order to reconcile them God struck Hezekiah with a malady and ordered Isaiah to visit the sick king. Isaiah told the latter that he would die, and that his soul also would perish because he had not married and had thus neglected the commandment to perpetuate the human species. Hezekiah did not despair, however, holding to the principle that one must always have recourse to prayer. He finally married Isaiah's daughter, who bore him Manasseh. However, in Gen. R. lxv. 4, as quoted in Yalḳ., II Kings, 243, it is said that Hezekiah prayed for illness and for recovery in order that he might be warned and be able to repent of his sins. He was thus the first who recovered from illness. But in his prayer he was rather arrogant, praising himself; and this resulted in the banishment of his descendants. R. Levi said that Hezekiah's words, "and I have done what is good in thy eyes" (II Kings xx. 3), refer to his concealing a book of healing. According to the Talmudists, Hezekiah did six things, of which three agreed with the dicta of the Rabbis and three disagreed therewith. The first three were these: (1) he concealed the book of healing because people, instead of praying to God, relied on medical prescriptions; (2) he broke in pieces the brazen serpent (see Biblical Data, above); and (3) he dragged his father's remains on a pallet, instead of giving them kingly burial. The second three were: (1) stopping the water of Gihon; (2) cutting the gold from the doors of the Temple; and (3) celebrating the Passover in the second month.

The question that puzzled Heinrich Ewald and others, "Where was the brazen serpent till the time of Hezekiah?" occupied the Talmudists also. They answered it in a very simple way: Asa and Joshaphat, when clearing away the idols, purposely left the brazen serpent behind, in order that Hezekiah might also be able to do a praiseworthy deed in breaking it.

The Midrash reconciles the two different narratives of Hezekiah's conduct at the time of Sennacherib's invasion (see Biblical Data, above). It says that Hezekiah prepared three means of defense: prayer, presents, and war, so that the two Biblical statements complement each other. The reason why Hezekiah's display of his treasures to the Babylonian ambassadors aroused the anger of God was that Hezekiah opened before them the Ark, showing them the tablets of the covenant, and saying, "It is with this that we are victorious".

Notwithstanding Hezekiah's immense riches, his meal consisted only of a pound of vegetables. The honor accorded to him after death consisted, according to R. Judah, in his bier being preceded by 36,000 men whose shoulders were bare in sign of mourning. According to R. Nehemiah, a scroll of the Law was placed on Hezekiah's bier. Another statement is that a yeshibah was established on his grave—for three days, according to some: for seven, according to others; or for thirty, according to a third authority. The Talmudists attribute to Hezekiah the redaction of the books of Isaiah, Proverbs, Song of Solomon, and Ecclesiastes (B. B. 15a).

Chronological interpretation
Understanding the biblically recorded sequence of events in Hezekiah's life as chronological or not is critical to the contextual interpretation of his reign. According to scholar Stephen L. Harris, chapter 20 of 2 Kings does not follow the events of chapters 18 and 19 (161). Rather, the Babylonian envoys precede the Assyrian invasion and siege. Chapter 20 would have been added during the exile, and Harris says it "evidently took place before Sennacherib's invasion' when Hezekiah was "trying to recruit Babylon as an ally against Assyria.' Consequently, "Hezekiah ends his long reign impoverished and ruling over only a tiny scrap of his former domain.' Likewise, The Archaeological Study Bible says, "The presence of these riches' that Hezekiah shows to the Babylonians "indicates that this event took place before Hezekiah's payment of tribute to Sennacherib in 701 BC" (564). Again, "Though the king's illness and the subsequent Babylonian mission are described at the end of the accounts of his reign, they must have occurred before the war with Assyria. Thus, Isaiah's chastening of Hezekiah is due to his alliances made with other countries during the Assyrian conflict for insurance. To a reader who interprets the chapters chronologically, it would appear that Hezekiah ended his reign at a climax, but with a scholarly analysis, his end would contrarily be interpreted as a long fall from where he began".

Other chronological notes
There has been considerable academic debate about the actual dates of reigns of the Israelite kings. Scholars have endeavored to synchronize the chronology of events referred to in the Hebrew Bible with those derived from other external sources. In the case of Hezekiah, scholars have noted that the apparent inconsistencies are resolved by accepting the evidence that Hezekiah, like his predecessors for four generations in the kings of Judah, had a coregency with his father, and this coregency began in 729 BCE.

As an example of the reasoning that finds inconsistencies in calculations when coregencies are a priori ruled out, dates the fall of Samaria (the Northern Kingdom) to the 6th year of Hezekiah's reign. Albright has dated the fall of the Kingdom of Israel to 721 BCE, while Thiele calculates the date as 723 BCE. If Abright's or Thiele's dating are correct, then Hezekiah's reign would begin in either 729 or 727 BCE. On the other hand, 2 Kings 18:13 states that Sennacherib invaded Judah in the 14th year of Hezekiah's reign. Dating based on Assyrian records date this invasion to 701 BCE, and Hezekiah's reign would therefore begin in 716/715 BCE. This dating would be confirmed by the account of Hezekiah's illness in chapter 20, which immediately follows Sennacherib's departure. This would date his illness to Hezekiah's 14th year, which is confirmed by Isaiah's statement that he will live fifteen more years (29 − 15 = 14). As shown below, these problems are all addressed by scholars who make reference to the ancient Near Eastern practice of coregency.

Following the approach of Wellhausen, another set of calculations shows it is probable that Hezekiah did not ascend the throne before 722 BCE. By Albright's calculations, Jehu's initial year is 842 BCE; and between it and Samaria's destruction the Books of Kings give the total number of the years the kings of Israel ruled as 143 7/12, while for the kings of Judah the number is 165. This discrepancy, amounting in the case of Judah to 45 years (165–120), has been accounted for in various ways; but every one of those theories must allow that Hezekiah's first six years fell before 722 BCE. (That Hezekiah began to reign before 722 BCE, however, is entirely consistent with the principle that the Ahaz/Hezekiah coregency began in 729 BCE.) Nor is it clearly known how old Hezekiah was when called to the throne, although 2 Kings states he was twenty-five years of age. His father died at the age of thirty-six; it is not likely that Ahaz at the age of eleven should have had a son. Hezekiah's own son Manasseh ascended the throne twenty-nine years later, at the age of twelve. This places his birth in the seventeenth year of his father's reign, or gives Hezekiah's age as forty-two, if he was twenty-five at his ascension. It is more probable that Ahaz was twenty-one or twenty-five when Hezekiah was born (and suggesting an error in the text), and that the latter was thirty-two at the birth of his son and successor, Manasseh.

Since Albright and Friedman, several scholars have explained these dating problems on the basis of a coregency between Hezekiah and his father Ahaz between 729 and 716/715 BCE. Assyriologists and Egyptologists recognize that coregency was a practice both in Assyria and Egypt. After noting that coregencies were only used sporadically in the northern kingdom (Israel), Nadav Na'aman writes,
In the kingdom of Judah, on the other hand, the nomination of a co-regent was the common procedure, beginning from David who, before his death, elevated his son Solomon to the throne. When taking into account the permanent nature of the co-regency in Judah from the time of Joash, one may dare to conclude that dating the co-regencies accurately is indeed the key for solving the problems of biblical chronology in the eighth century BC."

Among the numerous scholars who have recognized the coregency between Ahaz and Hezekiah are Kenneth Kitchen in his various writings, Leslie McFall, and Jack Finegan. McFall, in his 1991 article, argues that if 729 BCE (that is, the Judean regnal year beginning in Tishri of 729) is taken as the start of the Ahaz/Hezekiah coregency, and 716/715 BCE as the date of the death of Ahaz, then all the extensive chronological data for Hezekiah and his contemporaries in the late eighth century BCE are in harmony. Further, McFall found that no textual emendations are required among the numerous dates, reign lengths, and synchronisms given in the Hebrew Testament for this period. In contrast, those who do not accept the Ancient Near Eastern principle of coregencies require multiple emendations of the Scriptural text, and there is no general agreement on which texts should be emended, nor is there any consensus among these scholars on the resultant chronology for the eighth century BCE. This is in contrast with the general consensus among those who accept the biblical and near Eastern practice of coregencies that Hezekiah was installed as coregent with his father Ahaz in 729 BCE, and the synchronisms of 2 Kings 18 must be measured from that date, whereas the synchronisms to Sennacherib are measured from the sole reign starting in 716/715 BCE. The two synchronisms to Hoshea of Israel in 2 Kings 18 are then in exact agreement with the dates of Hoshea's reign that can be determined from Assyrian sources, as is the date of Samaria's fall as stated in 2 Kings 18:10. An analogous situation of two ways of measurement, both equally valid, is encountered in the dates given for Jehoram of Israel, whose first year is synchronized to the 18th year of the sole reign of Jehoshaphat of Judah in 2 Kings 3:1 (853/852 BCE), but his reign is also reckoned according to another method as starting in the second year of the coregency of Jehoshaphat and his son Jehoram of Judah (2 Kings 1:17); both methods refer to the same calendrical year.

Scholars who accept the principle of coregencies note that abundant evidence for their use is found in the biblical material itself. The agreement of scholarship built on these principles with both biblical and secular texts was such that the Thiele/McFall chronology was accepted as the best chronology for the kingdom period in Jack Finegan's encyclopedic Handbook of Biblical Chronology.

See also
List of biblical figures identified in extra-biblical sources

Further reading

Notes

References

Sources

Attribution:

External links

"Hezekiah." Encyclopædia Britannica. Encyclopædia Britannica Online.
King Hezekiah from Jerusalem Mosaic
Hezekiah  See all Bible verses pertaining to King Hezekiah
The Reign Of Hezekiah by John F. Brug
 Philippe Bobichon, Salomon et Ezéchias dans l'exégèse juive des prophéties royales et messianiques, selon Justin Martyr et les sources rabbiniques
 Sennacherib's Invasion of Hezekiah's Judah in 701 BC – by Craig C. Broyles
 Interactive Map of Sennacherib's Invasion of Hezekiah's Judah, including the accounts of Sennacherib, Herodotus, 2 Kings, Isaiah and Micah

 
730s BC births
680s BC deaths
8th-century BC Kings of Judah
7th-century BC Kings of Judah
Year of birth unknown
Jewish royalty